The Wooster Square Historic District encompasses much of the Wooster Square neighborhood of New Haven, Connecticut.  Centered on a rectangular park named in honor of General David Wooster, the area was developed as a residential neighborhood beginning in the 1820s, and was by the 1840s a desirable area to live, with many high-quality Greek Revival homes.  In the 1950s the area was the subject of a major community-led preservation effort that drew national attention.  The district was listed on the National Register of Historic Places in 1971.

Description and history
Wooster Square is located just east of downtown New Haven, from which it is separate by State Street and a railroad corridor.  The city acquired the land for the park at the center of the neighborhood in 1825; it had previously been open land.  The park that was laid out was named in honor of General David Wooster, a hero of the American Revolutionary War who at one time owned a warehouse near the southern end of the area.  It quickly developed as a fashionable residential area, with many fine Greek Revival houses, some of which were designed by local architect Henry Austin.  As the city industrialized further in the second half of the 19th century, the area's desirability declined, at it became a residential center populated mainly by Italian immigrants.  By the 1930s there were calls in the city to raze the neighborhood, and a plan was proposed to route Interstate 91 (which now forms the neighborhood's eastern and southern borders) directly through the park. The local community rallied, and developed preservation plans in the late 1950s, assisted by architecture students from Yale University.  The rehabilitation of the area was achieved at a time when historic preservation grants and loans were not generally available to homeowners.

The historic district does not encompass the entire Wooster Square neighborhood. Prominent houses that have been attributed to architect Henry Austin include the Howland House at 42 Academy Street, the Willis Bristol House at 584 Chapel Street, and the Governor English House at 592 Chapel Street. The latter house was built for James E. English, a prominent politician who served as a United States Senator and as Governor of Connecticut. The most prominent non-residential building in the district is the Conte School on its eastern edge, built in 1965 during the rehabilitation period.

Gallery

See also
National Register of Historic Places listings in New Haven, Connecticut

References

Historic districts on the National Register of Historic Places in Connecticut
National Register of Historic Places in New Haven, Connecticut